The 1991 Horsham District Council election took place on 2 May 1991 to elect members of Horsham District Council in England. It was held on the same day as other local elections. The Conservatives retained control of the council with a reduced majority. The Liberal Democrats gained a net total of 7 and Independent candidates had 2 councillors elected.

Council composition 

Prior to the election, the composition of the council was:

After the election, the composition of the council was:

Results summary

Ward results

Billingshurst

Bramber & Upper Beeding

Broadbridge Heath

Chanctonbury

Cowfold

Denne

Forest

Henfield

Holbrook

Itchingfield & Shipley

Keen D. was elected in Itchingfield & Shipley as a Conservative in 1987, when this seat was last contested.

Nuthurst

Pulborough & Coldwatham

Riverside

Roffey North

Rudgwick

Rusper

Slinfold

Southwater

Steyning

Storrington

Sullington

Trafalgar

Warnham

West Chiltington

West Grinstead

References

1991 English local elections
May 1991 events in the United Kingdom
1991
1990s in West Sussex